Norveig Karlsen (16 May 1922 – 9 March 1993) was a Norwegian artistic gymnast, born in Moss. She competed in gymnastics at the 1952 Summer Olympics in Helsinki.

References

External links

1922 births
1993 deaths
People from Moss, Norway
Norwegian female artistic gymnasts
Olympic gymnasts of Norway
Gymnasts at the 1952 Summer Olympics
Sportspeople from Viken (county)
20th-century Norwegian people